Željko Marasović (3 November 1951, Zagreb (Croatia) – 3 August 2021, Los Angeles) was Croatian American pianist, organist and composer of classical and film music.

Biography
Marasović studied piano with Ivo Maček, organ with Vlasta Hranilović and Žarko Dropulić and composition at the Zagreb Academy of Music, where he took degrees in 1974. Later he studied at Santa Cecilia Conservatory in Rome. He received a master's degree in music from the USC Thornton School of Music in Los Angeles.

Marasović is considered as one of the most prominent organists of his generation in Croatia, together with Anđelko Klobučar and Hvalimira Bledšnajder, performing also as organist of Zagreb Philharmonic. Together with Anđelko Klobučar, he is one of just few Croatian organists who performed at organs of Notre-Dame in Paris.

He made numerous recordings for label Jugoton between 1974 and 1985, when he moved to Los Angeles.

Filmography
1984 : Ellis Island, les portes de l'espoir ("Ellis Island") (feuilleton TV)
1987 : Testimony
1992 : The Real West
1993 : Civil War Journal
1994 : Ancient Prophecies (TV)
1994 : Titanic: The Legend Lives On (TV)
1994 : The American Revolution (TV)
1995 : The Last Days of World War II (TV)
1996 : Ancient Mysteries (série TV)
1996 : Mummies: Tales from the Egyptian Crypts (TV)
1997 : The St. Valentine's Day Massacre (TV)
1998 : Hidden Treasures (série TV)
1998 : The Big House (série TV)
1998 : The Irish in America: Long Journey Home (feuilleton TV)
1999 : Civil War Combat: America's Bloodiest Battles (TV)
2000 : Civil War Combat: The Bloody Lane at Antietam (TV)
2002 : Modern Marvels (TV)
2002 : Train Wrecks (TV)
2007 : *ORANGELOVE
2007 : *Spiritual Warriors, co-written and co-produced by Jsu Garcia
2009 : Pavle the Boy
2009 : Blossom
2009 : The Show Must Go On

References

Croatian composers
American male classical composers
American classical composers
American film score composers
Musicians from Zagreb
Living people
USC Thornton School of Music alumni
Yugoslav emigrants to the United States
American male film score composers
Year of birth missing (living people)